Elliot Green (born 5 October 1993) is an English footballer who plays as a defender for Adelaide City.

Career 
Green began his career at his local side Lincoln City in 2012, before spending time at various non-league sides in England. He moved to Sweden in 2014 with Ånge IF, before moving to Gällivare Malmbergets FF and Sollefteå GIF FF in 2015. He signed with United Soccer League side Whitecaps FC 2 on 10 February 2016.

On 20 January 2019, Green joined NPL South Australia side Adelaide City.

References

External links 
 
 

1993 births
Living people
Association football defenders
English footballers
English expatriate footballers
Lincoln City F.C. players
Eastwood Town F.C. players
Stamford A.F.C. players
Sheffield F.C. players
Grantham Town F.C. players
Lincoln United F.C. players
Whitecaps FC 2 players
Guiseley A.F.C. players
Adelaide City FC players
Expatriate soccer players in Canada
USL Championship players
National Premier Leagues players
English expatriate sportspeople in Canada